A footpath is a thoroughfare that is intended for pedestrian use.

Footpath may also refer to:

 Footpath (1953 film), 1953 Indian Hindi-language film written and directed by Zia Sarhadi
 Footpath (2003 film), 2003 Indian Hindi-language film directed by Vikram Bhatt

See also
 Rights of way in England and Wales
 Sidewalk
 Trail